Witness to the Execution is a 1994 American made-for-television drama film directed by Tommy Lee Wallace and starring Tim Daly and Sean Young. Its plot concerns a fictional television network's desire to carry the live execution of a condemned killer as a pay-per-view event.  It also portrays the events surrounding the attempt to create a television show about the execution.

Cast 
 Sean Young as Jessica Traynor
 Tim Daly as Dennis Casterline
 Len Cariou as Jake Tyler
 George Newbern as Phillip Tyler
 Dee Wallace as Emily Dawson 
 Alan Fudge as Wallace Sternberg
 Brian Markinson as Kirby Jacobs
  Marina Palmier as Cynthia Moore  
 Constance Jones as Lucy
 Alex Morris as Ramos  
 Lourdes Regala  as Dornbush
 Brandon Smith as Toyoshima
  Blue Deckert  as Lt. Mike Spalding
  James Black as the Chaplain

References

External links 
 

1994 drama films
1994 films
1994 television films
American drama television films
1990s English-language films
Films about capital punishment
Films about television
Films directed by Tommy Lee Wallace
Films scored by Mark Snow
Films set in 1999
Films set in the future
NBC network original films
1990s American films